Lorenzo Clayton is a contemporary Navajo sculptor, printmaker, conceptual and installation artist. His artwork is notable for exploring the concepts of spirituality through abstraction.

Background
Lorenzo Clayton was born and raised on the Tohajiilee Indian Reservation. Moving to New York City in 1973 Clayton earned his Bachelor of Fine Arts from Cooper Union in 1977. Between graduation and his teaching career he worked in the printing industry, then, in 1993, he was named assistant professor at Cooper Union and has also served as lithography instructor at Parsons The New School for Design

Clayton is a professor in the printmaking department at Cooper Union.

Artistic career

Spiritual exploration

Clayton's artwork is heavily influenced by the search for the spiritual, which he believes is seen throughout Indigenous cultures around the world. Through exploration of the ontological Clayton makes an effort for spiritual nourishment.

In the 1986–1995 series Richard's Third Hand Clayton explored his own spirituality through his love for abstraction and assemblage. The series Come Across (1994–2000) had Clayton blending both Christianity and Navajo spirituality to explore a personal loss of self. This artistic and spiritual exploration shows the journey Clayton made to reconnect with his Navajo identity.

In 2006 Clayton exhibited his "mythistoryquest" installations at the National Museum of the American Indian, New York. The exhibition, titled "Expeditions of the Spirits", featured installation and paperworks, examining the parallels between Christianity and Indigenous religions.

Collaborations
Collaborations with other artists and creators remain an imperative part of Clayton's career. In 2004 Clayton began working with fellow Cooper Union professor and engineer George Sidebotham on a series called Inner Equations. With a mission to use scientific method to explore irrational thoughts and ideas, the two used Sidebotham's knowledge of mathematical formulae to attempt to explain spiritual growth and relationships. Originally installed at the Jersey City Museum and then the Heard Museum, the installation featured a series of chalkboards mounted on opposing walls, one side of the room is painted white, the other side is painted black, to represent positive and negative. The chalkboards have diagrams and scribblings all over them, reminiscent of the chalkboard works of Cy Twombly. The writings, diagrams, and equations show the benefits of good and bad relationships on a person. Clayton also displayed the journal he kept during the creation of the artwork.

In 2009 Clayton collaborated with filmmaker and sound engineer Jacob Burckhardt to create Current, a 3-minute video installation as part of Wave Hill's exhibition "The Muhheakantuck in Focus". Muhheakantuck is a Lenape word meaning "the river that flows both ways" and was the original name for the Hudson River. The group exhibition featured work by contemporary artists from North and Central America creating artworks about the effects of Henry Hudson's contact with Indigenous people. Burckhardt and Clayton created an interpretation of that literal meaning creating a video displaying the river moving in different directions and flows. It represents metaphorically the ongoing changes and history of the river, "suggesting that the contact between Henry Hudson's Dutch expedition and the Lenape people was a pivotal point in time in the continuum of this force of nature."

Major collections

Eiteljorg Museum of American Indians and Western Art
Heard Museum, Phoenix, AZ
Jane Voorhees Zimmerli Art Museum, New Brunswick, NJ
Morris Museum, Morristown, NJ
Museum of Northern Arizona, Flagstaff, AZ
National Museum of the American Indian, Washington, DC
Newark Museum, Newark, NJ
University of Arizona, Tucson, AZ.

Notable exhibitions

IN/SIGHT, 2010, Chelsea Art Museum
The Muhheakantuck in Focus, 2009, Wave Hill, New York City
Relevant: Reflection-Reformation-Revival: Rethinking Contemporary Native American Art, 2009, Nathan Cummings Foundation, New York City
The Importance of In/Visibility: Recent Work by Native American Artists Living in New York City, 2009, Abrazo Interno Gallery
Native Voices, 2008, The Brooklyn Campus of Long Island University, Brooklyn, New York
New Tribe, 2006, National Museum of the American Indian, New York City
Moment by Moment: Mediation For The Hand, 2006, North Dakota Museum of Art, Grand Forks, North Dakota
Paumanok, 2006, Stony Brook University, Stony Brook, New York
Inner Equations, 2006, Heard Museum, Phoenix, Arizona
Who Stole the TeePee? 2000, National Museum of the American Indian, traveling
Osaka Triennale, 1994, JapanThe New Native American Aesthetic, 1984, California State University, Carsan, CaliforniaNo Trinkets, No Beads, 1984, Palace of Nations, Geneva, Switzerland

As well as exhibitions at various private galleries and other museums such as the Morris Museum, Museum of the Rockies, Seattle Center, Pratt Manhattan and others.

Major awardsEiteljorg Fellowship for Native American Fine Art, 1999, Eiteljorg Museum of American Indians and Western ArtPollock-Krasner Foundation Award", 1986, Pollock-Krasner Foundation
New Jersey State Council on the Arts Grant, 1983, New Jersey State Council on the Arts
Artist-in-Residence, 1982, Museum of the American Indian

See also

List of Native American artists
Visual arts by indigenous peoples of the Americas

References

Further reading
McMaster, Gerald. New Tribe, New York: the Urban Vision Quest. National Museum of the American Indian, Washington. 2005.

External links
Lorenzo Clayton, Native American Artist Roster of AMERINDA Inc.
Lorenzo Clayton, Vision Project, by Shanna Ketchum-Heap of Birds
Accrued Gravity at the Peiper-Riegraf Collection
Come Across (White Heat) from the NMAI's "Who Stole the TeePee?" exhibition.
"Native New Yorkers: Vision Quest", Maverick Arts Magazine

Navajo artists
Contemporary sculptors
Modern printmakers
Cooper Union faculty
Cooper Union alumni
Sculptors from New Mexico
Native American installation artists
Native American conceptual artists
Native American printmakers
Native American sculptors
1950 births
Living people
Artists from New York City
Sculptors from New York (state)